German Guenard Soltero (born 18 October 1942) is a Puerto Rican sprinter. He competed in the men's 400 metres at the 1960 Summer Olympics.

References

1942 births
Living people
Athletes (track and field) at the 1960 Summer Olympics
People from Mayagüez, Puerto Rico
Puerto Rican male sprinters
Olympic track and field athletes of Puerto Rico